Televisa Regional is a unit of Grupo Televisa which owns and operates television stations across Mexico. The stations rebroadcast programming from its subsidiary TelevisaUnivision's other networks, and they engage in the local production of newscasts and other programs. Televisa Regional stations all have their own distinct branding, except for those that are Nu9ve affiliates and brand as "Nu9ve <city/state name>".

Televisa traditionally has had agreements with independent station owners to supply programming for local stations. These stations were locally or regionally owned but featured Televisa programs; affiliated broadcasters included Televisoras Grupo Pacífico, with stations in five cities in western Mexico, and Tele-Emisoras del Sureste, with multiple stations in southeast Mexico. However, since 2018, many of these agreements have ended, with Nu9ve and FOROtv being multiplexed on Televisa-owned stations.

In April 2021, Televisa and US-based Univision Communications announced that they had proposed a merger between Televisa’s media and entertainment assets with Univision, which would form a new company to be known as TelevisaUnivision. The transaction was completed on January 31, 2022. Televisa Regional remained part of Grupo Televisa as part of conditions for the approval of merger by the Mexican authorities.

Televisa Regional stations
XHAGU-TDT 9.1 "Nu9ve Aguascalientes", Aguascalientes, Aguascalientes
XHS-TDT 4.1 "Canal 4", Ensenada, Baja California
XHBC-TDT 4.1 "Canal 4", Mexicali, Baja California
XEWT-TDT 12.1 "Canal 12", Tijuana, Baja California
XHAN-TDT 9.1, "Nu9ve Campeche", Campeche, Campeche
XHSNC-TDT 9.1, "Nu9ve Chiapas",  San Cristóbal de las Casas, Chiapas
XHTUA-TDT 9.1, "Nu9ve Chiapas", Tuxtla Gutiérrez, Chiapas
XHJCI-TDT 8.1 "Televisa Ciudad Juárez", Ciudad Juárez, Chihuahua
XHCHZ-TDT 9.1 "Nu9ve Chihuahua", Chihuahua, Chihuahua
XHPN-TDT 9.1 "Nu9ve Piedras Negras", Piedras Negras, Coahuila
XHAE-TDT 9.1 "Nu9ve Saltillo", Saltillo, Coahuila
XHTOB-TDT 9.1 "Nu9ve Laguna", Torreón, Coahuila
XHCKW-TDT 9.1 "Nu9ve Colima", Colima, Colima
XHDUH-TDT 13.1 "Nu9ve Durango", Durango, Durango
XHL-TDT 12.1 "Bajío TV", León, Guanajuato
XHACZ-TDT 9.1 "Nu9ve Acapulco", Acapulco, Guerrero
XHG-TDT 4.1 "XHG Canal 4" y 4.2 "+Visión", Guadalajara, Jalisco
XHPVE-TDT 5.2 "XHG Canal 4", Puerto Vallarta, Jalisco
XEQ-TDT 9.1 "Nu9ve Estado de México", Toluca, Mexico
XHCUM-TDT 9.1 "Nu9ve Morelos", Cuernavaca Morelos
XEFB-TDT 4.1 "Canal 4 Televisa Monterrey" , Monterrey, Nuevo León
XHCNL-TDT 8.1 "Canal 8 Televisa Monterrey", Monterrey, Nuevo León
XHOXO-TDT 8.1 "Nu9ve Oaxaca", Oaxaca, Oaxaca
XHP-TDT 4.1 "Tu Conexión con Puebla", Puebla, Puebla
XHQCZ-TDT 9.1 "Nu9ve Querétaro", Querétaro, Querétaro
XHQRO-TDT 9.1, "Nu9ve Quintana Roo", Cancún, Quintana Roo
XHCQR-TDT 9.1, "Nu9ve Quintana Roo", Chetumal, Quintana Roo
XHSLT-TDT 8.1 "Nu9ve San Luis Potosi", San Luis Potosí, San Luis Potosí
XHCUI-TDT 9.1 "Nu9ve Sinaloa", Culiacan, Sinaloa
XHLMI-TDT 9.1 "Nu9ve Sinaloa", Los Mochis, Sinaloa
XHMAF-TDT 9.1 "Nu9ve Sinaloa", Mazatlán, Sinaloa
XHCDO-TDT 12.1 "Televisa Sonora", Ciudad Obregón, Sonora
XHAK-TDT 12.1 "Televisa Sonora", Hermosillo, Sonora
XHVIZ-TDT 9.1, "Nu9ve Villahermosa", Villahermosa, Tabasco
XHCVI-TDT 9.1 "Nu9ve Ciudad Victoria", Ciudad Victoria, Tamaulipas
XHAB-TDT 8.1 "Vallevisión", Matamoros, Tamaulipas
XHBR-TDT 4.1 "Televisa Nuevo Laredo", Nuevo Laredo, Tamaulipas
XHTPZ-TDT 4.1 "Canal 4 Televisa del Golfo", Tampico, Tamaulipas
XHCOV-TDT 9.1, "Nu9ve Coatzacoalcos", Coatzacoalcos, Veracruz
XHFM-TDT 12.1 "TeleVer", Veracruz, Veracruz
XHAI-TDT 8.1 "TeleVer", Xalapa, Veracruz
XHMEN-TDT 8.1 "Nu9ve Yucatán", Mérida, Yucatán
XERV-TDT 9.1 "Las Estrellas XERV9", Reynosa, Tamaulipas

Former stations
Locally owned stations in various regions of the country used to take NU9VE, Las Estrellas or Foro programs; most of these relationships were unwound in early 2018 as Televisa began putting FOROtv as subchannels of its owned stations. These Televisa local stations are legally considered part of Televisa for the application of asymmetric regulations.
XHLAR-TDT, Nuevo Laredo, Tamaulipas,
XHFX-TDT/XHKW-TDT, Morelia, Michoacán (full-time Canal 5 and Las Estrellas)
XHBJ-TDT, Tijuana, Baja California
XHTX-TDT, Tuxtla Gutiérrez, Chiapas (full-time Canal 5)
XEJ-TDT, Ciudad Juárez, Chihuahua 
XHAUC-TDT, Chihuahua, Chihuahua
XHMH-TDT, Hidalgo del Parral, Chihuahua
XEDK-TDT, Guadalajara, Jalisco (full-time Nu9ve)
XHRCG-TDT, Saltillo, Coahuila, and its semi-satellite, XHCAW-TDT Ciudad Acuña, Coahuila
XHA-TDT, Durango, Durango
XHND-TDT, Durango, Durango
XHBG-TDT, Uruapan, Michoacán
XHKG-TDT, Tepic, Nayarit
XEDK-TDT, Guadalajara, Jalisco 
XHBO-TDT, Oaxaca, Oaxaca
XHCCU-TDT, Cancún, Quintana Roo
XHDE-TDT, San Luis Potosí, San Luis Potosí
XHSLV-TDT, San Luis Potosí, San Luis Potosí
XHFW-TDT, Tampico, Tamaulipas
XEFE-TDT, Nuevo Laredo, Tamaulipas 
XHLL-TDT, Villahermosa, Tabasco (full-time Canal 5)
XHY-TDT, Mérida, Yucatán
XHK-TV, La Paz, Baja California Sur (closed December 31, 2015)
Televisoras Grupo Pacífico:
XHI-TDT, Ciudad Obregón, Sonora-Los Mochis, Sinaloa
XHQ-TDT, Culiacán, Sinaloa
XHMZ-TDT, Mazatlán, Sinaloa
Tele-Emisoras del Sureste:
XHDY-TDT, San Cristóbal de las Casas, Chiapas
XHGK-TDT, Tapachula, Chiapas
XHTVL-TDT, Villahermosa, Tabasco and its satellites, XHCVP-TDT Coatzacoalcos, Veracruz and XHTOE-TDT, Tenosique, Tabasco

References

External links

 
Televisa broadcast television networks